is a city located in Nagano Prefecture, Japan. , the city had an estimated population of 157,480 in 67,783 households, and a population density of 290 persons per km2.

Geography
Ueda is located in central Nagano Prefecture, some 40 kilometers from the prefectural capital of Nagano City and 190 kilometers from Tokyo. The Chikuma River divides the city into two parts.

Surrounding municipalities
Nagano Prefecture
 Matsumoto
 Tōmi
 Suzaka
 Nagano
 Chikuma
 Nagawa
 Aoki
 Chikuhoku
 Gunma Prefecture
 Tsumagoi

Climate
The city has a climate characterized by hot and humid summers, and relatively mild winters (Köppen climate classification Cwa).

History
Ueda is located in former Shinano Province and during the Nara period was the provincial capital. The ruins of the Shinano Kokubunji (provincial temple) are also located within Ueda. However, the provincial capital was shifted to Matsumoto during the early Heian period. During the Sengoku period, the area was the centre of the powerful Sanada clan. During the Edo period, Ueda was a castle town and headquarters of Ueda Domain under the Tokugawa shogunate. During the post-Meiji restoration cadastral reform of April 1, 1889, the modern town of Ueda was established. Ueda was elevated to city status on May 1, 1919. On March 6, 2006, Ueda absorbed the neighbouring towns of Maruko and Sanada, and the village of Takeshi (all from Chiisagata District).

Demographics
Per Japanese census data, the population of Ueda peaked around the year 2000 and has declined since.

Government
Ueda has a mayor-council form of government with a directly elected mayor and a unicameral city legislature of 30 members. The city contributes four members to the Nagano Prefectural Assembly. In terms of national politics, Ueda is grouped with Komoro, Chikuma, Saku, Tōmi, Minamisaku District, Nagano, Kitasaku District, Nagano, Chiisagata District, Nagano and Hanishina District, Nagano to form Nagano 3rd District  in the lower house of the National Diet.

Economy
Ueda is a regional commercial centre with a mixed agricultural and light industrial economy. The main crops include rice, apples, grapes, cabbage and walnuts. The traditional industry of Ueda was sericulture and cotton-weaving. The city now hosts automobile components and electronics manufacturing.

Education

University and colleges 
Shinshu University
Nagano University
Ueda Women's Junior College

Primary and secondary education
Ueda has 25 public elementary schools and 12 public middle schools operated by the city government and one public middle school shared with the town of Nagawa. The city has five public high schools operated by the Nagano prefectural Board of Education, and four private high schools.
Ueda High School
Ueda Someyaoka High School
Ueda Higashi High School
Ueda Chikuma High School
Maruko Syugakkan High School
Ueda Nishi High school (private)
Sakura International High School (private)
KLARK Memorial International High School (private)
Tsukuba Kaisei High School (private)

Transportation

Railway
 East Japan Railway Company - Hokuriku Shinkansen
  
  Shinano Railway - Shinano Railway Line
  –  –  – 
Ueda Electric Railway Bessho Line
  –  –  –  –  –  –  –  –  –  –  –  –  –  –

Highway
 Jōshin-etsu Expressway

External relations
Ueda maintains friendship and sister cities relationships with the following cities.

Friendship cities
 Broomfield, Colorado, United States (from 2001 with former Maruko)
 Ningbo, China (from 1995 with Ueda)
 Nerima, Tokyo (from 1994 with former Takeshi)

Sister cities
 Davos, Graubünden, Switzerland (from 1976 with former Sanada)
 Kamakura, Kanagawa (from 1979 with Ueda)
 Jōetsu, Niigata (from 1979 with Ueda)
 Toyooka, Hyōgo (from 1979 between Ueda and former town of Izushi)
 Kudoyama, Wakayama (from 1977 with former Sanada)

Cities with emergency collaboration pacts
Ueda has entered into pacts with all the Japanese cities listed above and two more cities listed below for mutual collaboration in case of emergency.
 Ageo, Saitama
 Numazu, Shizuoka

Local attractions
Ueda Castle
Sanada-shi Yakata - A fortified residence of the Sanada clan, main bastion of the Sanada clan until Sanada Masayuki moved their base to Ueda Castle in 1585.
Anraku-ji in Bessho Onsen, Ueda has the only extant octagonal pagoda in Japan. The pagoda has been designated as National Treasure.
 Utsukushigahara Open-Air Museum – An open-air museum with sculptures on the Utsukushigahara plateau, which opened in June 1981
Bessho Onsen

Notable residents
Katsusaburō Yamagiwa (1863–1930), pathologist
Juri Miyazawa, actress

References

External links

Official Website 

 
Cities in Nagano Prefecture